Senftleben is a surname. Notable people with the surname include:

Günther Senftleben (1925–1982), German cinematographer
Ingo Senftleben (1974), German politician

Ženklava (German: Senftleben), village in the Czech Republic

German-language surnames
Surnames from nicknames